AsiaSat 3S, was a geosynchronous communications satellite for AsiaSat of Hong Kong to provide communications and television services all across Asia, the Middle East and Oceania.

Background 
In March 1998, AsiaSat ordered a replacement satellite, for US$195 million, from Hughes Space and Communications. Designated AsiaSat 3S, the new satellite is a replica of AsiaSat 3.

Launch 
AsiaSat 3S was launched for AsiaSat by a Proton-K / DM-2M launch vehicle on 21 March 1999, at 00:09:30 UTC, destined for an orbital location at 105.5° East. A replacement for Asiasat 3, placed in the wrong orbit by a Proton launch in 1997, Asiasat 3S carried C-band and Ku-band transponders. The Blok DM-2M upper stage placed the satellite in a Geostationary transfer orbit (GTO). Asiasat's on-board R4D-11-300 apogee engine was then used to raise perigee to geostationary altitude. It replaced AsiaSat 1 on 8 May 1999.

Mission 
It was replaced by AsiaSat 7.

See also

References 

Satellites using the BSS-601 bus
Communications satellites in geostationary orbit
Spacecraft launched in 1999
AsiaSat satellites
Spacecraft launched by Proton rockets